Nemanthus is a genus of sea anemones. It is the only genus in the monotypic family Nemanthidae.

Species 
The following species are recognized:

 Nemanthus annamensis Carlgren, 1943
 Nemanthus californicus Carlgren, 1940 
 Nemanthus nitidus (Wassilieff, 1908)

References

Nemanthidae
Hexacorallia genera